Garuk (also Romanized as Garūk and Gorūk; also known as Garū, Garūq, Gerow, Girau, and Guru) is a city in Sirik Rural District, Central, Sirik County, Hormozgan Province, Iran. At the 2006 census, its population was 3,705, in 628 families.

References 

Populated places in Sirik County
Cities in Hormozgan Province